The 1974–75 Divizia B was the 35th season of the second tier of the Romanian football league system.

The format has been maintained to three series, each of them having 18 teams. At the end of the season the winners of the series promoted to Divizia A and the last four places from each series relegated to Divizia C.

Team changes

To Divizia B
Promoted from Divizia C
 Foresta Fălticeni
 Relonul Săvinești
 Unirea Focșani
 Chimia Brăila
 Voința București
 Automatica Alexandria
 Victoria Călan
 Minerul Moldova Nouă
 Metalul Aiud
 Minerul Baia Sprie
 Oltul Sfântu Gheorghe
 CSU Brașov

Relegated from Divizia A
 Rapid București
 SC Bacău
 Petrolul Ploiești

From Divizia B
Relegated to Divizia C
 Viitorul Vaslui
 Minerul Motru
 Olimpia Oradea
 Caraimanul Bușteni
 Carpați Brașov
 Minerul Cavnic
 Petrolul Moinești
 Nitramonia Făgăraș
 Textila Odorheiu Secuiesc
 Victoria Roman
 Dunărea Giurgiu
 Gloria Bistrița

Promoted to Divizia A
 FC Galați
 Chimia Râmnicu Vâlcea
 Olimpia Satu Mare

Renamed teams 
Unirea Arad was renamed as Rapid Arad.

League tables

Serie I

Serie II

Serie III

See also 
 1974–75 Divizia A
 1974–75 Divizia C

References

Liga II seasons
Romania
2